Kimberly Foster (born July 6, 1961) is an American former actress, best known for her role as Michelle Stevens in the CBS prime time soap opera Dallas from 1989 to 1991.

Life and career
Kimberly Foster was born in Fort Smith, Arkansas. She graduated from Booneville High School and was a cheerleader. Kim, as she was known growing up, was raised in Booneville, Arkansas, the daughter of Marion Gary Foster and Paula (Atkins) Foster. She made her screen debut appearing opposite Joan Collins in the 1983 television film Making of a Male Model and later guest starred in a number of shows include The Fall Guy, Paper Dolls, Knight Rider, The A-Team and Hotel.

In 1985, Foster was regular cast member in the short-lived NBC drama series The Best Times produced by Lorimar Television. The following year, she made her film debut in the romantic comedy One Crazy Summer with John Cusack. She later appeared in Dragnet (1987) with Tom Hanks and Dan Aykroyd, You Can't Hurry Love (1988) with Bridget Fonda, and It Takes Two (1988) with fellow Arkansan George Newbern. In 1989, Foster was cast in a series regular role as Michelle Stevens in the thirteenth and fourteenth seasons of the CBS prime-time soap opera Dallas which she played from 1989 to 1991.  Her character was briefly a sister-in-law to Bobby Ewing and later briefly a daughter-in-law to J.R. Ewing.

After Dallas, Foster starred in the 1993 vampire comedy film Loves Bites and the following year joined the cast of the ABC daytime drama soap opera, All My Children playing Liz Sloan to 1995.

Filmography

Film

Television

References

External links
 

American television actresses
American film actresses
Actresses from Arkansas
1961 births
Living people
People from Fort Smith, Arkansas
American soap opera actresses
20th-century American actresses
People from Booneville, Arkansas
21st-century American women